Un día para vivir is a Mexican thriller anthology television series that premiered on Azteca 7 on 6 September 2021. The series is produced by Rafael Urióstegui, and it is star María José Magán.

Premise 
Un día para vivir will tell the stories of men and women of different ages who are apparently going through a good time in their lives, but receive a visit from death who warns them that they have 24 hours to resolve what they have pending. In a race against time, each one will have to decide their responsibility and do the impossible if they want another chance.

Cast 
María José Magán will play the character of "La muerte" —The Death in English— throughout the series. In each episode, we will have as guests actors who have paraded through the world of television, such as:
 Alejandra Lazcano
 Cecilia Ludmila Ponce
 Lorena del Castillo
 Jack Duarte
 Andrea Noli
 Mauricio Islas
 Issabela Camil
 Pedro Sicard
 Sylvia Pasquel

Production 
The series was announced in early January 2021 by TV Azteca, as part of Azteca 7's new programming for 2021; it was originally going to be called Contratiempo. The production of the series began filming on March 17, 2021, taking into account hygiene and safety measures in light of the COVID-19 pandemic in Mexico, and the title of the series will be changed to 24 horas para vivir. A mass was also held to celebrate the start of filming, which was attended by the production team, actress María José Magán, executives Rafael Urióstegui and Adrián Ortega, as well as writers Héctor Forero and David Mascareño.

The series marks the return of TV Azteca to fiction production, to which the V.P. of production and programming of Azteca 7, Adrián Ortega, expressed his happiness for the restart of these fiction formats.

In May 2021, the series was presented by TV Azteca Internacional at the LA Screenings 2021, now called Un día para vivir as the official title of the series, having confirmed a total of 60 episodes produced. On May 13 of the same year, PRODU's official website launched the official trailer for the series.

Ratings 

}}

References

External links 
 

2021 Mexican television series debuts
TV Azteca
Mexican drama television series
2020s drama television series